The 2007 edition of the UNAF U-17 Tournament took place in September 2007, with Morocco as the host of the tournament.

Participants

Tournament

Champions

References

2007 in African football
2007
2007
2007–08 in Moroccan football
2007–08 in Algerian football
2007–08 in Tunisian football
2007–08 in Libyan football